Jordan David Lyden (born 30 January 1996) is an Australian professional soccer player who plays as a defensive midfielder for Leyton Orient.

Born in Perth, Lyden played youth soccer for ECU Joondalup before moving to England to play for Aston Villa in 2012, making his professional debut for the side in 2016.

He has represented Australia at under-20 level.

Career

Club
Born in Perth, Australia, Lyden moved to England at the age of 16 and joined the academy of Aston Villa. In December 2015, Lyden got called up to the senior side, who were struggling in the Premier League at the bottom of the table. He made his professional senior debut for the side on 9 January 2016 in the FA Cup against Wycombe Wanderers. He came on as an 83rd-minute substitute in a 1–1 draw. He was handed his first start, playing at right-back, in the replay ten days later which resulted in a 2–0 win for Villa. Lyden made his Premier League debut for the side on 14 February 2016 against Liverpool, coming on as a substitute for Leandro Bacuna after 66 minutes with the team five goals down, with the game finishing 6–0. Lyden made his league starting debut for Aston Villa in his third Premier League appearance on 10 April against Bournemouth.

Lyden's Aston Villa career was beset by a number of injuries, and found it difficult to stake a claim to a first team space. On 31 August 2018, after making only four first team appearances in his six years at the club, Lyden went on loan to Oldham Athletic.  On 17 November 2018, Lyden scored his first goal in league football in a 3–1 victory for Oldham over Cambridge United. The long range effort earned plaudits from fans across the Football League. He returned to Aston Villa on 1 January 2019, after playing 14 times for Oldham, and scoring 1 goal. He hoped that his performances on loan would be enough to secure him a new contract.

However, Lyden's poor luck with injuries continued; and on 11 January 2019, just 10 days after returning to Aston Villa from his loan spell, Lyden suffered a muscle injury in training – which would take three months to recover from.

On 17 March 2019, Lyden made a post on his personal Instagram announcing that he had left Aston Villa.

On 26 July 2019, Lyden joined Swindon Town on a one-year deal following a successful trial. 

On 20 January 2023, Lyden signed for League Two leaders Leyton Orient on a short-term deal until the end of the season.

International 
In late 2013, Lyden was called up to the Australia under-20 side to travel to Malaysia for 2014 AFC U-19 Championship qualification. He made his debut for the Young Socceroos in a win over Hong Kong, coming on for Stefan Mauk in the second half.

Career statistics

a: Two appearances in the Football League Trophy

Honours
Aston Villa U23s

 Premier League Cup: 2017–18

Swindon Town
EFL League Two: 2019–20

References

External links
Jordan Lyden at AVFC (archived)

1997 births
Living people
Australian soccer players
Soccer players from Perth, Western Australia
Association football midfielders
Australia under-20 international soccer players
Aston Villa F.C. players
Oldham Athletic A.F.C. players
Swindon Town F.C. players
Leyton Orient F.C. players
Premier League players
English Football League players
Australian expatriate soccer players
Expatriate footballers in England
Australian expatriate sportspeople in England